Aspicilia cuprea, the copper sunken disk lichen, is a large  diameter copperish-tan to brown crustose areolate lichen that forms large patches of adjacent lichens on rock (saxicolous). It grows only from northern California to Baja California. It is common and characteristic of siliceous rock in interior valley and western mountains of California. One to many irregularly shaped black apothecia are sunken into the thallus. Lichen spot tests are K+ red, C−, P+ orange, and I−.

References

Lichen species
Lichens described in 2007
Lichens of North America
Pertusariales